Reenard (or Renard as it is also spelled) is a Gaelic Athletic Association club from the Kerry, Ireland townland of Reenard. The club competes in Gaelic football competitions organized by the Kerry county board and the South Kerry divisional board. Together with nine other clubs they supply players to the South Kerry Divisional team.

History
The first mention of Reenard was when Pat McGillicuddy of Reenard won the first Dublin Senior Football Championship in 1887 with Erins Hope which was then the name of football team of St. Patrick's College of Education in Drumcondra.  
McGillicuddy returned to County Kerry to take up principalship of the National School in the nearby townland of Knockeens in 1890 and immediately set about organising Gaelic football in the locality.

Reenard contested the 1902, 1903, 1904 and 1905 South Kerry Championship and were affiliated to the South Kerry Board in 1904.  In 1925 the South Kerry League commenced seeing Reenard compete along with other South Kerry teams. In 1942 playing as "Con Keatings" they won their first title, the Iveragh Junior Championship, by defeating Waterville on a score 1-4 to 1-1.

In 1944 the  club was renamed Reenard after the townland.  Reenard's first success at senior level came in their first South Kerry Senior Football Championship final in 1948 when they defeated Derrynane by 1-9 to 2-5. Due to emigration and economic deprivation the club was forced to amalgamate with the Foilmore club in the 1960s and 70's. 
Ned O'Neill, from Reenard Point, was the first South Kerryman to win an All-Ireland medal when Kerry beat Kildare in the 1903 All-Ireland Senior Football Championship (the final was played in 1905 due to circumstances).

On Sunday 29 July 1984 Reenard's official ground, Pairc Ui Dhonnchu, was opened. It was named after Tomas O'Donnchu, the first President of Reenard GAA. The president at that time, Brian Mac Mathuna, opened the ground and to mark the occasion Reenard played a game versus Kingdom Kerry Gaels.

Honours

Senior
 Iveragh Junior Championship (As Con Keatings) - 1942
 South Kerry Senior Football Championship (5) 1948, 1951, 1953, 1974, 1989
 South Kerry Special League - 1966, 1980
 South Kerry Senior League - 1968, 1975, 1980
 Kerry Novice A Football Championship (3) 1984, 1989, 2001
 Kerry County Senior Football League Division 5 - 2004, 2015
 Kerryman Centenary Sevens Shield - 2004
 County Senior Football League Division 4 - 2005
 Cahill Cup - 2005
 South Kerry Junior Football Championship (1) 2006
 County Junior Football League Division 6 Champions - 2013

Minor
 South Kerry Minor Football Championship - 1967, 1979, 1982, 1996, 1997, 2012
 South Kerry Minor Football League Division 2 - 1987, 1988
 County Minor Football League Division 5 - 1988
 County Minor Football League Division 6 - 1998, 2002
 South Kerry Minor B Football Championship - 2000, 2003, 2007
 Kerry Minor Football League Division 5A -2004, 2005
 South Kerry Minor Football League Division 1 - 2010, 2012

U-16
 South Kerry A Football Championship - 2000,2012.2017
 South Kerry Football League-2017

U-14
 County League Division 8 - 2004
 South Kerry A Championship - 2004,2010,2012,2017
 Kerry Football League Division 6 - 2017
 Kerry Football League Division 5 - 2018

U-12
 South Kerry B Football Championship - 1996, 1999
 South Kerry A Football Championship - 1998, 2000
 County Football League Regroup C -2004
 County Football League Group K - 2005

South Kerry Senior Football Championship
They have won the South Kerry Senior Football Championship 5 times (once together with Foilmore).

Honours as part of South Kerry
 Senior County Championship: 8 - 1955, 1956, 1958, 1981, 1982, 2004, 2005, 2006
 Kerry Under 21 Football Championship: 9 - 1984, 1987, 1988, 1991, 1992, 2003, 2004, 2005, 2007
 Kerry Minor Football Championship: 9 - 1963, 1970, 1971, 1975, 1992, 1999, 2000, 2001, 2005

Notable players
 Eamonn O'Neill Kerry intercounty player
 Dan Kelly Kerry intercounty player
 Francie O'Shea Kerry intercounty player
 John T. O'Sullivan Kerry intercounty player Minor All Ireland Medal Winner 1980
 Jim Sugrue Kerry intercounty player
 Pat Tommy O'Sullivan Kerry intercounty player
 Pat McCrohan Kerry intercounty player  U21 All Ireland medal winner 1976
 Mike O'Neill Kerry intercounty player
 Frank O'Donoghue Kerry intercounty player
 John Sugrue County Trainer Laois Senior Football Manager 2018
 Killian Young Kerry intercounty player Senior All Ireland Medal Winner 2006 & 2007 & 2014
 Eoin O Neill Kerry intercounty player & London intercounty player  U21 All Ireland medal winner 2008
 The O'Mahony brothers, James, John & Jerry, distinguished themselves with Reenard, Kerry and later with London
 Mossie Kelly, John Daly, Robbie and J.J. Wharton all played with the Kingdom Kerry Gaels in London.
 Brian Sugrue Kerry intercounty player Munster Minor Champions 2013, 2014. All Ireland Minor 2014 All Ireland Junior Medal Winner 2015
 Robert Wharton Kerry intercounty player Munster Minor Champions 2013, 2014 All Ireland Minor 2014 All Ireland Junior Medal Winner 2016
 Michael O Leary Kerry intercounty player Munster Minor Champions 2017, All Ireland Minor 2017

External links
 Official ReenardGAA Club website
 Reenard on GAA info

Gaelic football clubs in County Kerry
Gaelic games clubs in County Kerry